Imran Nazir is a Pakistani writer best known for his worksRishtey, and Mohabbat Aag Si that earned him widespread acclaim including Best TV Writer nomination at 15th Lux Style Awards. He is a head of content on Larachi Entertainment and a freelance writer at Geo Entertainment.

Filmography

Television    
 Topi Drama
 Rishtey
 Mohabbat Aag Si
 Aas
 Sada Sukhi Raho
 Larka Karachi da, Kuri Lahore di 
 Khot
 Nazr-e-Bad
 Jithani
 Pinjra
 Rasm-e-Duniya
 Thays
 Kashf
 Mehboob Aapke Qadmon Mein

Awards and nominations
 2016: Lux Style Award for Best TV Writer - nominated.

References

External links 
 

Living people
Pakistani television writers
Punjabi people
University of the Punjab alumni
People from Lahore
Year of birth missing (living people)